Medics is a British medical drama series that was first broadcast on ITV on 14 November 1990. The show ran for five series with a total of 40 episodes. The show came to end on 24 November 1995. It follows the everyday lives and loves, trials and tribulations of the doctors, nurses, patients and administrative staff of a large teaching hospital in the north-west of England near the city of Manchester.

Cast
Medics had many cast members over its five-year history:

This is listed by order of first appearance:

Jimmi Harkishin – Dr. Jay Rahman, registrar
Penny Bunton – Dr Jessica Hardman, medical student (1990–1993)
Francesca Ryan – Claire Armstrong (1990–1994)
Emma Cunningham – Dr. Gail Benson, senior house officer (1992–1995)
Tom Baker – Dr. Geoffrey Hoyt, general surgeon (1992–1995)
James Gaddas – Dr. Robert Nevin, senior registrar (1992–1995)
Sue Johnston – Ruth Parry, administrator (1992–1995)
Teddie Thompson – Dr. Alison Makin, house officer (1992–1995)
Hugh Quarshie – Dr. Tom Carey, research consultant (1992–1994)
Dinah Stabb – Miss Helen Lomax, plastic surgeon (1994–1995)
Patricia Kerrigan – Dr. Sarah Kemp, senior registrar (1994–1995)
Clarence Smith – Billy Cheshire, charge nurse (1994–1995)
Nick Dunning – Derek Foster, resources manager (1994–1995)

External links
 
 

1990 British television series debuts
1995 British television series endings
1990s British drama television series
1990s British medical television series
ITV television dramas
Television series by ITV Studios
Television shows set in Manchester
English-language television shows
Television shows produced by Granada Television